A gunshot is the discharge of a firearm, producing a mechanical sound effect and a chemical gunshot residue.

Gunshot or gun shot may also refer to:

 Gunshot (band), a British hip hop group
 Gunshot (film), a 1996 Telugu film directed by S. V. Krishna Reddy starring Ali, Prakash Raj and Keerthi Reddy
 "Gunshot", a 2011 song by Nessbeal from Sélection naturelle
 "Gunshot", a 2014 song by Lykke Li from I Never Learn
 "Gun Shot", a 2012 song by Nicki Minaj from Pink Friday: Roman Reloaded
 "Gunshots", a 2016 song by Blank Banshee from MEGA

See also
 Gunshot wound
 Gunshot residue (GSR), also known as cartridge discharge residue (CDR), or firearm discharge residue (FDR)
 Gunshot suicide